"The Gravediggers" is the second episode of the fourth series of the 1960s cult British spy-fi television series The Avengers, starring Patrick Macnee and Diana Rigg. It was first broadcast by Scottish Television on Tuesday 5 October 1965. ABC Weekend Television, who commissioned the show, broadcast it in its own regions four days later on Saturday 9 October. The episode was directed by Quentin Lawrence, and written by Malcolm Hulke.

Plot
Steed and Emma visit a railway buff to investigate a deathly plot to sabotage the country's early warning radar defence systems.

Cast
Patrick Macnee as John Steed
Diana Rigg as Emma Peel
Ronald Fraser as Sir Horace Winslip 
Paul Massie as Johnson 
Caroline Blakiston as Miss Thirlwell 
Victor Platt as Sexton 
Charles Lamb as Fred 
Wanda Ventham as Nurse Spray 
Ray Austin as Baron 
Steven Berkoff as Sager 
Bryan Mosley as Miller 
Lloyd Lamble as Dr. Hubert Marlow 
Aubrey Richards as Dr. Palmer (uncredited)

Location

The Stapleford Miniature Railway near Melton Mowbray, Leicestershire was where Emma Peel was filmed tied to the railway track.

References

External links

The Avengers (season 4) episodes
1965 British television episodes